The women's shot put event  at the 1987 IAAF World Indoor Championships was held at the Hoosier Dome in Indianapolis on 6 March.

Results

References

Shot
Shot put at the World Athletics Indoor Championships